Events from the year 1679 in art.

Events
 (unknown)

Works

François de Troy – Portrait of Nils Bielke
Cornelius Jansen (attributed) – Memorial painting of Isaac Bargrave in Canterbury Cathedral
Jan van Kessel – Portrait of a family in a garden

Publications
First part of Jieziyuan Huazhuan ("Manual of the Mustard Seed Garden"), a manual on landscape painting, published in China

Births
January 27 – Jean-François de Troy, French painter (died 1752)
April 2 - Marcellus Laroon the Younger, English painter and draughtsman (died 1772)
April 24 - Francesco Mancini, Italian painter (died 1758)
date unknown
Elias Baeck, German painter and engraver (died 1747)
Giuseppe Dallamano, Italian painter of quadratura in Turin (died 1758)
Francesco Fernandi, Italian painter (died 1740)

Deaths
January 23 – Girolamo Forabosco, Italian painter (born 1605)
January 29 – Carlo Ceresa, Italian painter of portraitures, altarpieces and religious works (born 1609)
February 3 (bur.) – Jan Steen, Dutch genre painter (born 1626)
February 27 (bur.) – Joan Carlile, English professional portrait painter (born c. 1606)
March 27 – Abraham Mignon, Dutch flower painter born at Frankfurt (born 1640)
April 22 – Giovanni Battista Passeri, Italian painter of genre and still life paintings (born 1610)
June 15 – Guillaume Courtois, French painter and etcher (born 1628)
October - Barent Avercamp, Dutch painter (born 1612)
December 
Jan van de Cappelle, Dutch Golden Age painter of seascapes and winter landscapes (born 1626)
Jan Victors, Dutch painter of subjects from the Bible (born 1619)
date unknown
Baldassare Bianchi, Italian painter of the Baroque period (born 1612)
Tomas de Aguiar,  Spanish painter of the Baroque period (born unknown)
Josse de Corte, French sculptor (born 1627)
Felipe Diricksen, Spanish Baroque painter primarily of portraits and religious paintings (born 1590)
Robert Streater, English landscape, history, still-life and portrait artist, architectural painter and etcher (born 1621)

 
Years of the 17th century in art
1670s in art